is a Japanese economist and professor at the University of Tokyo.

Career 
Kitao was born on 1972 , in Saitama, Japan. She graduated from Waseda University in 1996. She worked for Goldman Sachs, originally in the Investment Banking Division, then moved to the Fixed Income Division, before leaving the company in 1999. After working for Goldman Sachs, she returned to school to further her education.

She received a Master's Degree in Public Administration/International Development (M.P.A./I.D.) in 2001 from the John F. Kennedy School of Government at Harvard University. Then she went to New York University and graduated with her Ph.D. in 2007 under the supervision of Thomas J. Sargent and Gianluca Violante. After graduating from NYU, Kitao served as an assistant professor at the University of Southern California (2007-2009). Then, she worked at the Federal Reserve Bank of New York as an economist, and later as a senior economist until 2011. Kitao then returned to the realm of academia. At the City University of New York, she worked as an associate professor in the Department of Economics (2011-2015). She returned to Japan to become a professor at Keio University (2015-2018). Currently, she works as a professor in the Faculty of Economics at the University of Tokyo.

She was awarded the Nakahara Prize in 2016, the first woman to be awarded the prize.

Teaching
Kitao has taught many classes related to Macroeconomics at many renowned University's, including NYU, USC, and the University of Tokyo. At NYU, she taught Macroeconomics and Advanced Macroeconomics in the doctoral program for Economics. At Keio University, in Japan, she instructed courses at the undergraduate and graduate level. The courses were focused around Macroeconomic topics including money, banking, and international economies. At the University of Tokyo, she instructed a course on International finance, at the undergraduate level, and Macroeconomic Models of Heterogenous Agents, at the graduate level. Her instruction has allowed her to teach at many high tier institutions.

Research
Sagiri Kitao's research primarily focuses on the field of macroeconomics. She also studies topics including income taxation, wealth distribution and inequality, social security, health insurance, unemployment insurance, demographic transitions, disability insurance, entrepreneurship, and Japanese economy.

Sagiri Kitao has studied many macroeconomic topics. Her research history includes many research topics about Japan. Since 2015, she has published seven papers about different policies that affect Japan. Her most recent research is titled "Policy Uncertainty and Cost of Delaying Reform: The Case of Aging Japan" and was published in the Review of Economic Dynamics in January, 2018. She has published two papers recently with Selahattin Imrohoroglu and Tomoaki Yamada. And in March 2017, she published "When Do We Start? Pension Reform in Aging Japan" in the Japanese Economic Review, which was based on her Nakahara Prize lecture. This paper discusses how specific reforms could raise the retirement age by three years could help reduce the replacement rate by 20%. She then discusses how delaying from 2020 to 2030 to 2040 can raise tax burden by 8% and lowers the welfare by 3% for future Japanese citizens.

Noticing the severity of Covid-19, Sagiri Kitao researched and published "Effects of the COVID-19 on the Labor Market and Inequality in Japan"(新型コロナ危機による労働市場への影響と格差の拡大)together with Shinnosuke Kikuchi and Minamo Mikoshiba. This paper discusses how current pandemic has impacted the labor market in Japan and intensifies the inequality within Japanese society. This paper is included in the chapter 15 of Economics of the COVID-19 Crisis, K. Kobayashi and M. Morikawa, Ed., Nikkei, 2020(『コロナ危機の経済学』（小林・森川編）日本経済新聞出版、2020年).

Selected publications

References

External links 
  Sagiri Kitao's personal website
 Faculty profile at Keio University
 Researcher page at National Bureau of Economic Research

1972 births
Living people
People from Saitama Prefecture
21st-century Japanese economists
Macroeconomists
Japanese women economists
Waseda University alumni
Harvard Kennedy School alumni
New York University alumni
University of Southern California faculty
City University of New York faculty
Academic staff of Keio University
Academic staff of the University of Tokyo
Goldman Sachs people